Lindra is a genus of fungi within the Lulworthiaceae family.

References

External links

Sordariomycetes genera
Lulworthiales